Bruce Radford (October 5, 1955 – May 23, 2011) was an American football defensive end. He played for the Denver Broncos in 1979, the Tampa Bay Buccaneers in 1980 and for the St. Louis Cardinals in 1981.

He died on May 23, 2011, in New Orleans, Louisiana at age 55.

References

1955 births
2011 deaths
American football defensive ends
Grambling State Tigers football players
Denver Broncos players
Tampa Bay Buccaneers players
St. Louis Cardinals (football) players
People from Pineville, Louisiana
Players of American football from Louisiana
Sportspeople from Rapides Parish, Louisiana